Manfred Todtenhausen (born 8 December 1950) is a German politician. Born in Wuppertal, North Rhine-Westphalia, he represents the Free Democratic Party (FDP). Manfred Todtenhausen has served as a member of the Bundestag from the state of North Rhine-Westphalia from 2012 till 2013 and since 2017.

Life 
After attending school, Todtenhausen trained as an electrician from 1966 to 1970. He did his military service from 1970 to 1972 in Wolfenbüttel and Braunschweig. From 1972 to 1977 he was a journeyman in his training company. From 1977 he attended the master school at the HWK Düsseldorf, which he completed in 1978 as a master electrician. Afterwards he was plant manager and concession holder at an electrical company in Wuppertal until 1981. From 1981 to 1988 Todtenhausen was a self-employed master electrician, since 1988 he has been master electrician and managing director of Elektro Todtenhausen GmbH.  Manfred Todtenhausen has been a member of the FDP since 2002. He became member of the bundestag after the 2017 German federal election. He is a member of the Petitions Committee and a member of the Committee for Economy and Energy. He is a deputy member of the committee for construction, housing, urban development and municipalities. He is spokesman for petitions of the FDP parliamentary group.

References

External links 

  
 Bundestag biography 
 

 

 

1950 births
Living people
Members of the Bundestag for North Rhine-Westphalia
Members of the Bundestag 2017–2021
Members of the Bundestag 2021–2025
Members of the Bundestag for the Free Democratic Party (Germany)